Brian Hamilton (born 13 November 1937) is an Irish fencer. He competed in the individual foil and team épée events at the 1960 Summer Olympics.

References

External links
 

1937 births
Living people
Irish male épée fencers
Olympic fencers of Ireland
Fencers at the 1960 Summer Olympics
Irish male foil fencers